Selatosomus pruininus, the Great Basin wireworm, is a nocturnal species of click beetles native to the Great Basin area of the western United States.

References

Elateridae
Beetles of North America